Rauno August Aaltonen (born 7 January 1938), also known as "The Rally Professor", is a Finnish former professional rally driver who competed in the World Rally Championship throughout the 1970s.

Career
Before WRC was established Aaltonen competed in the European Rally Championship. He won the championship in 1965, with Tony Ambrose as his co-driver. He also won the Finnish Rally Championship in 1961 and 1965. In 1966, he partnered Bob Holden in Australia to win the premier touring car race, the Gallaher 500, in a Mini Cooper S at Mount Panorama in New South Wales.

Aaltonen finished second on six occasions in the Safari Rally, which is considered one of the most difficult courses in rallying. In 1985, he was leading the rally by two hours when his engine broke down before the last few special stages. His other merits include winning the 1000 Lakes Rally in 1961, the RAC Rally in 1965, the Monte Carlo Rally in 1967, the Southern Cross Rally in 1977, and a Coupe des Alpes at the Alpine Rally in 1963 and 1964.

Despite now being remembered as one of the Flying Finns of rallying, Aaltonen started his career on speed boats and later moved on to motorcycles competing in road racing, speedway and motocross. Before he became the first Finnish European Rally Champion, he was the first Finn to win a Grand Prix motorcycle racing competition.

Aaltonen was a proponent of left-foot braking. In 2010, he was among the first four inductees into the Rally Hall of Fame, along with Erik Carlsson, Paddy Hopkirk and Timo Mäkinen.

Technique of rotating a car by 360 degrees, while maintaining trajectory, was named after him.

Career results

Complete 24 Hours of Le Mans results

Complete Bathurst 500/1000 results

Complete British Saloon Car Championship results
(key) (Races in bold indicate pole position; races in italics indicate fastest lap.)

Gallery

References

External links

Aaltonen at RallyBase

Finnish rally drivers
Finnish motorcycle racers
Finnish racing drivers
125cc World Championship riders
1938 births
World Rally Championship drivers
Living people
24 Hours of Le Mans drivers
Bathurst 1000 winners
World Sportscar Championship drivers
European Rally Championship drivers
Sportspeople from Turku
Australian Endurance Championship drivers